William J. Dominik (born ) is an American-Australian scholar of Classical Studies. He is presently Visiting Professor and Integrated Researcher of Classical Studies at the University of Lisbon and Professor Emeritus of Classics at the University of Otago.

Life 

Dominik is the son of university professors of classical music and spent his childhood in a number of states in the USA.  After studying Classics at the University of Durham in 1973-1974 and completing his student teaching at the American School Foundation of Mexico City in 1975, he earned a BA in Classics and English from the University of the Pacific and a California Teaching Credential from the California Commission on Teacher Credentialing in 1975. Dominik left the USA in 1976 to live overseas for what has amounted to all but a few years. A resident of Sintra, Portugal as of 2018, Dominik possesses dual Australian and American citizenship. He is married to Brazilian artist and former nutritionist Najla Barroso Dominik, a member of the Academy of Letters and Arts of Salvador, Brazil.

Career 

Dominik received his PhD in Classical Studies from Monash University in 1989 after gaining an MA in Classical Humanities from Texas Tech University in 1982. He taught at the University of Natal from 1991 to 2001, where he rose to the rank of Professor and Chair of Classics and Director of the Program in Classics. Dominik moved to the University of Otago as Professor and Chair of Classics in 2002, where he served as Head of the Department of Classics from 2002 to 2009; he was awarded Professor Emeritus status in 2015.

An idiosyncratic aspect of Dominik's career has been its wide international dimension. In addition to holding the aforecited posts at the University of Natal and the University of Otago, he has served in recent years as Invited/Visiting Professor, Integrated Researcher, and Research Fellow at the University of Lisbon (2018-2023) and CAPES Visiting Foreign Professor at the Federal University of Bahia (2010, 2016–17). He has also held visiting professorships and other teaching/research positions at Texas Tech University (1981-1982, 1990-1991), Monash University (1985-1988), University of Leeds (1997-1998), University of Cambridge (2000-2001), University of Edinburgh (2006-2007), and the University of Oxford (2013).

Research 

Dominik is the author or editor of several hundred publications (mainly chapters in edited books and journal articles), including sixteen monographs, on Latin literature, especially Roman epic of the Flavian period; Roman rhetoric; the classical tradition and reception; lexicography; etymology; and other topics. Dominik's research is significant for its emphasis upon the political, especially critical and dissident, aspects of imperial Roman literature (to which one critic refers as “la osadía de Dominik") and its positive hermeneutic approach to the literature and rhetoric of the imperial era.

A distinctive feature of Dominik's research and pedagogical output is its collaborative nature, which is evident especially through the publication of various co-edited books and a journal. He was the founding editor and manager of the Classics series Scholia: Studies in Classical Antiquity (1992-2011). In addition to  having served as a referee for over sixscore publishers, journals, and institutions, Dominik has supervised, examined, and moderated over a gross of postgraduate dissertations.

Dominik has delivered over eightscore lectures and papers, including many invited or commemorative presentations such as a University of Cambridge Faculty of Classics Literature Seminar (2000), an Inaugural Professorial Lecture at the University of Otago (2002), the keynote address at the Federal University of Bahia Inaugural Classics Colloquium (2010), the Third Biennial Constantine Leventis Memorial Lecture at the University of Ibadan (2010), a Royal Society of New Zealand National Identity Symposium Presentation (2011), an Oxford Philological Society lecture (2013), and the Inaugural Seminar at the Federal University of Sergipe Postgraduate Program in History (2016).

Dominik has received over a couple of hundred individual research fellowships, grants, and awards (including renewals and sponsored visits), such as a Commonwealth Fellowship at the University of Leeds (1997-1998), a South African Human Sciences Research Council Established Researcher Grant (1997-1998), a Visiting Research Fellowship at Clare Hall, Cambridge (2000-2001), an Institute for Advanced Studies in the Humanities Visiting Research Fellowship at the University of Edinburgh (2006-2007), a Visiting Research Centre Associateship at St. John's College, Oxford (2013), a Plumer Visiting Research Fellowship at St. Anne's College, Oxford (2013), and a Foundation for Science and Technology Research Fellowship at the University of Lisbon (2019-2022).

Books 

 Brill’s Companion to Statius (Leiden 2015). . (co-ed. with C. E. Newlands and K. Gervais)  
 Petronii Satyricon Concordantia (Hildesheim 2013). . (co-ed. with J. E. Holland) 
 A Companion to Roman Rhetoric (Oxford 2010, 2007). . (co-ed. with J. Hall) 
 Writing Politics in Imperial Rome (Leiden 2009). . (co-ed. with J. Garthwaite and P. A. Roche)  
 Flavian Rome: Culture, Image, Text (Leiden 2003). . (co-ed. with A. J. Boyle)  
 Literature, Art, History: Studies on Classical Antiquity and Tradition. In Honour of W. J. Henderson (Hildesheim 2003). . (co-ed. with A. F. Basson) 
 Anthologiae Latinae Concordantia Pars 1: A-L (Hildesheim 2002). . (co-ed. with P. G. Christiansen and J. E. Holland) 
 Anthologiae Latinae Concordantia Pars 2: M–Z (Hildesheim 2002). . (co-ed. with P. G. Christiansen and J. E. Holland) 
 Words & Ideas (Mundelein 2018 [corrected reprint], 2012, 2009, 2008, 2006, 2002). . (ed.) 
 Words & Ideas: Answer Key (Mundelein 2017 [reprint], 2014, 2009, 2006). .
 Roman Verse Satire: Lucilius to Juvenal. A Selection with an Introduction, Text, Translations, and Notes (Mundelein 2011 [revised edition], 1999). . (co-ed. and co-tr. with W. T. Wehrle) 
 Roman Eloquence: Rhetoric in Society and Literature (London 1997).  hbk;  pbk. (ed.)
 Concordantia in Sidonii Apollinaris Epistulas (Hildesheim 1997). . (co-ed. with P. G. Christiansen and J. E. Holland)  
 The Mythic Voice of Statius: Power and Politics in the Thebaid (Leiden 1994). . 
 Speech and Rhetoric in Statius’ Thebaid (Hildesheim 1994). . 
 Concordantia in Claudianum (Hildesheim 1988). . (assisted ed. P. G. Christiansen)

References

External links 
 University of Lisbon: William J. Dominik
 University of Otago: William J. Dominik
 Academia.edu: William J. Dominik
 Video: William J. Dominik, "Bringing the Classics and the Humanities into the New Millennium." Inaugural Professorial Lecture, University of Otago, New Zealand (20 November 2002).

Classics educators
American classical scholars
Australian classical scholars
Scholars of Latin literature
Academic journal editors
Academic staff of the University of Otago
Academic staff of the University of Lisbon
Academic staff of the University of Natal
Texas Tech University faculty
Monash University alumni
Texas Tech University alumni
University of the Pacific (United States) alumni
Living people
1953 births